The History of the Australian cricket team began when eleven cricketers from the colonies of New South Wales (NSW) and Victoria formed an eleven to play a touring team of professional English cricketers at Melbourne in March 1877. Billed as the "Grand Combination match", the game is now known as the first Test match. Encouraged by a 45-run victory, the colonists believed that they had enough cricketing talent to take on the English on their own soil. A team organised and managed by John Conway, a former Victorian player, toured England during the 1878 season. After a discouraging loss to Nottinghamshire in the opening match of the tour, the Australians met a Marylebone Cricket Club (MCC) team at Lord's on 26 May 1878. Australia's upset win by nine wickets was "the commencement of the modern era of cricket", according to Lord Hawke.

The 1860s
In 1865, a match was arranged between a team of Aboriginal cricketers and European settlers from various pastoral stations; the indigenous team won. The playing of cricket by indigenous people of the Western District reflected their changing circumstances. At this time there were no formal associations.

The 1870s

The 1870s saw the first official matches between English and Australian teams. Due to the amount of time that it took teams to travel from England to Australia (and vice versa), these teams were generally not a true representation of the best players for each country. At the time, there was no significance placed on these matches – statisticians later called them "test matches" between England and Australia.

James Lillywhite's English side toured Australia in between January and April 1877 and played the first two test matches after a drawn match against a New South Wales side.

England in Australia 1876/77. Match length: Timeless. Balls per over: 4. Series result: Drawn 1–1. 

Just over a year later, an Australian side visited England and played a match against the MCC. In what turned out to be a match that was completed in one day, only 105 runs were scored with the Australian side emerging the victors by nine wickets. This match however was not granted test status.

In 1879, Lord Harris led an English side down under between January and March. This tour schedule involved a single test match followed by two series of two matches against Victorian and New South Wales sides.

England in Australia 1878/79. Match length: Timeless. Balls per over: 4. Series result: Australia, 1–0.

The 1880s

Australia toured England 5 times during the 1880s and played 27 Test matches. One of these matches was played in 1880, 1 in 1882 and 3 in 1884, 1886 and 1888 respectively. Losing a total of 15 matches. Note: Balls per over: 4. 16 of them were timeless matches while 11 were 3-day Test matches. During this time Percy McDonnell led the Australian scoring with 950 runs. Closely followed by Billy Murdoch on 860 and Alec Bannerman on 745. during this time Spofforth was the most prolific wicket taker with 94 wickets at an average of 18.41 runs per wicket. Palmer closely followed with 78 wickets at an average of 21.51 per wicket.

The 1890s

Australia toured England 4 times during the 1890s and played 26 Test matches against them. (won 10, lost 10)

Note: Half the Tests had 5 balls per over and half had 6 balls per over. Half of them were 3-day Test matches and half were timeless Test matches.
 1890: 2 Tests
 1893: 3 Tests
 1896: 3 Tests
 1899: First 5 Test tour

List of Australian Test captains in the 1890s
The Australian Test captains in the 1890s were Murdoch (2 Tests), Blackham (7), Giffen (4), Trott (8) and Darling (5).

List of top Australian Test run scorers in the 1890s
 Darling 1139

List of top Australian Test wicket takers in the 1890s
 Giffen 74
 Trumble 63
 Jones 56
 Turner 51

1900s

Australian team started touring other countries such as South Africa which had Test status (first tour in 1903) and New Zealand for the first time in 1905.

Test tours
Australia toured England 3 times between 1900–1909 and toured South Africa for the first time in 1903. Australia played 33 Test matches in this decade winning 16 of them and losing 9. Most of them were against England and only 3 of them were against South Africa. Test cricket had for the first time gone to Africa. All the Test matches had 6 balls per over. Most of them were 3-day Test matches while 15 of them were timeless Test matches.
 1902: 5 Tests in England
 1903: First tour of South Africa, 3 Tests
 1905: 5 Tests in England
 1909: 5 Tests in England

Australian Test captains
The two main Australian Test team captains during this period were Darling and Noble.

List of top Australian wicket takers of the period
 Noble 89
 Saunders 79
 Trumble 78

The 1910s

Australia were visited in the first two summers of this decade by South Africa and England respectively. In 1912 the Australian team toured England and played in the 1912 Triangular Tournament with their hosts and South Africa.

Australia toured USA and Canada in June to August 1913, playing five matches, four in Philadelphia and one in Toronto.

Needless to say, this was the decade of World War I. After the last match of the Triangular series in August 1912, Australia did not play another Test match until December 1920 when England, as the Marylebone Cricket Club toured Australia in a five Test series.

The 1920s

Test tours

Australia toured England twice and South Africa once during this decade. Australia played 28 Test matches during this decade, winning 14 and losing 6. Most of them were against England and only 3 against South Africa. 5 of the Test matches had 8 ball overs. Most of the Test matches were timeless whereas there were 9 three-day Test matches and 3 four-day Test matches.
 1921: 5 Tests in England, 3 Tests in South Africa in November
 1926: 5 Tests in England

Australian Test captains
The two main Australian Test captains during this decade were Armstrong and Collins. Both of them had a good record.

List of top Australian Test run scorers of the 1920s
 Ryder 1394
 Collins 1352
 Macartney 1252
 Gregory 1146

List of top Australian wicket takers of the 1920s
 Mailey 99
 Gregory 85

The 1930s

Australia toured England thrice and had the first 5 Test tour of South Africa. Australia played 39 Tests in this decade winning 22 and losing 10. Australia also toured India and Ceylon in 1935 but no official international match was played although India got Test status in 1932.

Test tours
 1930: 5 Tests in England
 1934: 5 Tests in England
 1935–1936: First 5 Test tour of South Africa
 1938: 4 Tests in England

Australian Test captains
The leading Australian Test captain in this decade was Woodfull. Don Bradman led the Australian team in 9 Test matches in this decade.

Australian Test batsmen
Don Bradman, regarded by most followers of the game as the greatest batsman to have played the game scored 4625 Test runs in this decade at an average of 102.77 runs per innings with 19 centuries.

Sir Donald eclipsed other performances which would have otherwise had been noticed such as Stan McCabe's 2748 runs at an average of 48.2 runs per innings.

List of top Australian wicket takers in the 1930s
 Grimmett 169 wickets at an average of 21.95 runs per wicket
 O'Reilly 136 wickets at an average of 23.68 runs per wicket

The 1940s

Test tours

This decade was affected by World War II. Due to this Australia played only 17 Test matches. Their performance was impressive perhaps due to the Don Bradman factor as they won 13 of them and did not lose a single Test match. Most of the victories were against England. Australia were led by Sir Donald Bradman during this period. He scored 1903 runs at an average of 105.72 runs per innings.
 1946 Australia's first Test tour of New Zealand (1 Test)
 1948 5 Test tour of England (see: The Invincibles (cricket))
 1949–1950 5 Test tour of South Africa

Australian Test bowlers
 Ray Lindwall 70 wickets at an average of 19.17 runs per wicket.
 Johnston 54 wickets at an average of 18.51 runs per wicket.

The 1950s

England was no longer the prime opponent. Australia played 13 Test matches against South Africa and 10 against West Indies. Most of the Tests during this period were played with 8 ball overs and 5-day Test matches although Australia also played 22 six-day Test matches. Australian Test captains were Hassett, Johnson and the popular Richie Benaud who had an exceptional record during this period.
Australia's leading runscorer in this decade was Harvey with 4573 runs at an average of 50.25 runs per innings while the leading wicket taker was Richie Benaud with 165 wickets at an average of 23.95.

Test tours
 1953 5 Tests in England
 1955 5 Test tour of West Indies
 1956 5 Tests in England
 1956 first tour of Pakistan, 1 Test
 1956 first tour of India, 3 Tests
 1958 5 Tests in South Africa
 1959 3 Tests in Pakistan
 1959–1960 5 Tests in India

The 1960s

 Includes one tied match

Richie Benaud captained Australia in 18 Test matches, Bob Simpson in 29 and Bill Lawry in 16. Lawry was the leading Test batsman. He scored 4717 Test runs at an average of 49.65 runs per innings while McKenzie was the leading Test wicket taker with 238 Test wickets.

Test tours
 1961 5 Tests in England
 1964 5 Tests in England
 1964 3 Tests in India
 1964 1 Test in Pakistan
 1965 5 Tests in West Indies
 1966–1967 5 Tests in South Africa
 1968 5 Tests in England
 1969 5 Tests in India

The 1970s
Australia's Record in Test Match Cricket 1970–1979

Australia's Record in ODI Cricket 1970–1979

T: denotes tournament played between three or more teams

The 1980s

Australia's Record in Test Match Cricket 1980–1989

# plus one tied result

Australia's Record in ODI Cricket 1980–1989

T: denotes tournament between three or more teams.

Australian cricket during the 1980s was comparatively unsuccessful, particularly following the retirement of players such as Marsh and Lillee. Queenslander Allan Border, rated as one of the finest middle-order players in history, took over as captain and attempted a re-building process. For quite some time, the common wisdom was that Australia's score in an innings would be "Border plus 100". Border achieved the feat of scoring more than 150 runs in both innings of a Test during a tour of Pakistan during this decade.

As the decade continued, a number of talented players made their debuts and established themselves in the team. Among these were fast bowler Craig McDermott, wicket keeper Ian Healy, Steve Waugh and batsman Dean Jones. Cult heroes such as overweight Tasmanian batsman David Boon and Victorian bowler Merv Hughes also earned places in the team.

In the closing years of the 1980s, Australia won back the Ashes from England and began an era of dominance in that series which only ended in 2005. This decade was also notable for Australia's first Cricket World Cup victory, achieved in 1987 when they won against England by 7 runs in the most closely fought World Cup final to date at Eden Gardens in Calcutta. These two aforementioned victories are considered to have signalled the genesis of the team's rise to dominance, though at that point they were still behind the West Indies and failed to win any Tests in India or Pakistan. In 1986, Australia and India played out only the second tie in Test history, with Jones producing a famous double-century innings in sapping heat.

The 1990s
Australia's Record in Test Match Cricket 1990–1999

Australia's Record in ODI Cricket 1990–1999

The 1990s saw the dawn and twilight of many well-known Australian cricketers Shane Warne became a household name during the 1993 Ashes tour, Allan Border retired after playing South Africa at Durban in 1994, Glenn McGrath became famous as a metronome (and as a rabbit) during the 1994–95 tour of the West Indies, Ricky Ponting came onto the scene with 96 against Sri Lanka during 1995–96, Craig McDermott was forced to retire during the 1996–97 season, while Brett Lee appeared at the turn of the century. Meanwhile, Australian cricket was run by three captains, Allan Border, Mark Taylor and Steve Waugh.

Australia continued to assert their dominance over The Ashes during the 1990s, won the unofficial Test 'world championship' prize from West Indies during 1994–95, won a second World Cup in 1999 and began a long winning streak in 1999, both in one-day internationals and Tests. The only venues where Australia struggled were India and Sri Lanka. The 1992–93 Frank Worrell Trophy series against the West Indies was the last Test series Australia lost at home until the 2008–09 series loss to South Africa.

A year after losing to Sri Lanka in the final of the 1996 World Cup, Australia adopted a policy of fielding separate Test and one-day sides. The policy was intended to ensure that players were only chosen for the side for which they were suitable. This resulted in the immediate removal of captain Taylor and his deputy Ian Healy from the ODI team. The move proved successful, and was also adopted by other teams such as England and the West Indies.

The defeat of the then-dominant West Indies on their 1995 tour of the Caribbean is viewed as the moment when Australia became the dominant side in the world. Since then, in spite of a few occasions (specifically the 2005 Ashes series) the Australians have had an extremely high winning rate that compares favourably to the leading teams in history (much like the West Indies for the two decades prior).

During the period from October 1999 till November 2007, The Aussies played 93 tests and Won 72 out of those. During the period they featured in 28 test series, winning in 24 of them and losing only twice.

The 1994–95 World Series Cup was expanded to include an Australia A side, and by making the finals, it proved that Australia had a lot of young cricketers ready to represent their country (and many of them did)
 Mark Taylor's captaincy, following the retirement of Allan Border

The 2000s 
Australia's Record in Test Match Cricket 2000–2009

During this decade, Australia's dominance has continued to the point that they have gone months sometimes even a full calendar year without losing a single match and have racked up many records along the way. Following Steve Waugh's omission in 2002 from One Day International cricket and, in his retirement in 2004 from Test cricket, Ricky Ponting replaced him as Captain and continued the team's international dominance.

The 2005 Ashes series 2–1 loss to England was considered a disaster. The return series in 2006–07, was, however, a resounding success, with the Australians completing a 5–0 whitewash of the English, a feat not witnessed since Warwick Armstrong's side in 1920–21. The 2006–07 season also saw the retirements of Shane Warne, Glenn McGrath and Justin Langer. The Ashes were again lost 2–1 in England in 2009, this result reduced Australia to 4th in the ICC Test Rankings, their lowest ever position. Australia's dominance during this time extended to One-Day Cricket, with the Australians winning a third consecutive Cricket World Cup in 2007, following their successes in 2003 and 1999, and being undefeated in the 2003 and 2007 tournaments. Australia pulled out of their cricket tour of Pakistan because of Terrorism in Pakistan on 11 March 2008.

The 2010s 
Australia's Record in Test Match Cricket 2010–2019

The 2020s 
Australia's Record in Test Match Cricket 2020–current

Tournament history

World Cup
The Australian cricket team has had a rich history participating in the World Cup. At present, they have won the World Cup five times as well as three titles in a row, the only team to do so. After the 2007 tournament, their dominance of the tournament can be analysed through the winning percentage of all countries which have participated, as Australia hold a 10% higher winning rate over the next best side.

Their dominance of the tournament in 1999–2007 was such that they won 23 consecutive games. To put this into perspective, the second longest winning streak behind this is nine straight victories by the West Indies team of the 1970s.

ICC Champions Trophy
The Australian cricket team finally captured victory in the ICC Champions Trophy series after beating the West Indies in the final of the 2006 series and backed it up by winning their second straight ICC Champions Trophy by beating New Zealand in the 2009 edition in South Africa.

ICC knockout
The Australian cricket team made it as far as the quarter-finals in the ICC knockout. They have reached the quarter-finals on two different occasions.

Commonwealth Games
Despite topping their pool, Australia lost to South Africa in the gold medal play-off.

Austral-Asia Cup
Australia have entered the Austral-Asia cup three times. The best result came in 1990 in which they were runners-up.

Twenty20 World Cup
They reached the semi-final of the first Twenty20 World Cup in 2007 losing to the eventual champions India, but also lost to Pakistan and Zimbabwe in the group stages. In the 2009 World Cup they were eliminated in the qualification round after losing by six wickets to both the West Indies and Sri Lanka. In 2010 they were runners up after losing to England by seven wickets in the Final. In 2012 they reached the semi finals but lost to the West Indies by 74 runs. In 2014

History of Australia's One-Day International Shirts
.

References

History of Australian cricket
Australia in international cricket
Cricket
Australia cricket